WDTF-LP (107.9 FM) is a Catholic religious formatted low-power broadcast radio station licensed to and serving Berkeley Springs, West Virginia, United States.  WDTF-LP is owned and operated by Defenders of the Faith, Inc.

Translators
WDTF-LP programming is also carried on a broadcast translator station to extend or improve the coverage area of the station.  Defenders of the Faith, Inc. have three other applications for translators with the FCC to be located in Winchester, Virginia, Martinsburg, West Virginia, and Hagerstown, Maryland.

External links
 WDTF The Defender Online
 

Bath (Berkeley Springs), West Virginia
Catholicism in West Virginia
DTF
Catholic radio stations
DTF
Radio stations established in 2004